The 1976 Dixie 500 was a NASCAR Winston Cup Series race that took place on November 7, 1976, at Atlanta International Raceway in Hampton, Georgia, United States.

Background
Atlanta International Raceway (now Atlanta Motor Speedway) is one of ten current intermediate tracks to hold NASCAR races; the others are Charlotte Motor Speedway, Chicagoland Speedway, Darlington Raceway, Homestead Miami Speedway, Kansas Speedway, Kentucky Speedway, Las Vegas Motor Speedway, New Hampshire Motor Speedway, and Texas Motor Speedway. However, at the time, only Charlotte and Darlington were built.

The track's turns are banked at twenty-four degrees, while the front stretch, the location of the finish line, and the back stretch are banked at five.

Race report
The total time of the race was three hours and fifty-five minutes. Four cautions were made for forty-one laps. Dave Marcis defeated David Pearson by two car lengths.

In his third career start, Dale Earnhardt reached a career best finish to that point of his very young career in a 19th-place finish. Chevrolets filled out the majority of the racing grid.

Notable crew chiefs for this race included Travis Carter for Bobby Allison, Tim Brewer, Sterling Marlin for his dad Coo Coo Marlin, Dale Inman for Richard Petty, Harry Hyde for race-winner Marcis, Jake Elder, and Junie Donlavey. Forty-six thousand fans attended this live race. Total winnings for this race were $132,625 ($ when adjusted for inflation).

Canadian driver Jack Donohue would finish the race in last place without completing any laps of the race. he was granted 55 championship points just for qualifying.

The race was primarily a battle between Marcis, David Pearson, Yarborough, and Donnie Allison; for most of the first 62 laps in particular the top four raced nose to nose; Stock Car Racing Magazine writer Richard Benyo reported “the lead would change at four different spots” on the oval.

G.C. Spencer crashed on the first lap while Billy McGinnis blew his vehicle's engine on lap 15. A faulty head gasket forced David Sisco to leave the race on lap 34. Oil pressure issues would force Dick May out of the race on lap 60 while faulty wheel bearings eliminated Chuck Bown from the race on lap 75. Coo Coo Marlin had a bad engine on lap 114. Oil pressure issues forced Richard Petty to leave the race on lap 157, which ended his chance to overtake Yarborough for the Winston Cup title.

Frank Warren fell out with overheating by Lap 164 and Bobby Allison left on lap 168. Engine problems would claim the vehicles of Richard Childress on lap 218, Lennie Pond on lap 228, and Terry Bivins on lap 250. A problematic valve spring on lap 252 would end Richie Panch's weekend and Grant Adcox's engine would stop working on lap 254.

David Pearson looked like a winner on lap 301 as he drove by Marcis on lap 301 but Marcis was cooling his tires and 14 laps later drove by Pearson.  A late yellow set up a two-lap sprint and Marcis won it, and the race.

Richie Panch, son of Marvin Panch, would retire after the end of this race while Billy McGinnis would make his NASCAR Cup Series debut.

Dale Earnhardt survived a huge crash when Dick Brooks slid down the banking of Turn 3; Earnhardt hit Brooks and tumbled to Turn 4.

Future NASCAR star Bill Elliott had a role wiping the windshield of 16th-place finisher Gene Felton's stock car; Elliott would go on to have a successful Cup Series career of his own 12 years later.

Qualifying

Finishing order
Section reference:

 Dave Marcis
 David Pearson†
 Donnie Allison
 Cale Yarborough
 Buddy Baker†
 Benny Parsons†
 Darrell Waltrip
 Neil Bonnett†
 Sam Sommers
 Bobby Wawak†
 Bruce Hill
 James Hylton†
 J.D. McDuffie†
 Skip Manning
 Sonny Easley†
 Gene Felton
 Jimmy Means
 D.K. Ulrich
 Dale Earnhardt*†
 Grant Adcox*†
 Richie Panch*†
 Terry Bivins*
 Cecil Gordon†
 Lennie Pond*
 Richard Childress*
 Bobby Allison*
 Frank Warren*
 Richard Petty*
 Dick Brooks*†
 Coo Coo Marlin*†
 Chuck Bown*
 Dick May*†
 David Sisco*
 Billy McGinnis*
 G.C. Spencer*†
 Jack Donohue*

† signifies that the driver is known to be deceased 
* Driver failed to finish race

Standings after the race

References

Dixie 500
Dixie 500
Dixie 500
NASCAR races at Atlanta Motor Speedway